{{Infobox Christian leader
| type = archbishop
| honorific-prefix = The Most Reverend
| name =  Patrick Chakaipa
| honorific-suffix = 
| title = Archbishop of Harare
| image = 
| imagesize = 
| alt = 
| caption = 
| church = 
| archdiocese = Harare
| province = Harare
| metropolis = 
| diocese = 
| see = 
| elected = 
| appointed = 31 May 1976
| term_start = 31 May 1976
| quashed = 
| term_end = 8 April 2003
| predecessor = Francis William Markall
| opposed = 
| successor = Robert Ndlovu
| previous_post = Titular Bishop of Rucuma (1972–1973)Auxiliary Bishop of Salisbury (1972)
| ordination = 15 August 1965
| ordinated_by = 
| consecration = 14 January 1973
| consecrated_by = Francis William Markall
| cardinal = 
| rank = 
| birth_name = Patrick Fani Chakaipa
| birth_date = 
| birth_place = Mhondoro, Zimbabwe
| death_date = 
| death_place = Harare, Zimbabwe
| buried = 
| nationality = Zimbabwean
| religion = Roman Catholic
| residence = 
| parents = 
| spouse = 
| children = 
| occupation = 
| profession = 
| alma_mater = 
| motto = 
| signature = 
| feast_day = 
| venerated = 
| saint_title = 
| beatified_date = 
| beatified_place = 
| beatified_by = 
| canonized_date = 
| canonized_place = 
| canonized_by = 
| attributes = 
| patronage = 
| shrine = 
| suppressed_date = 
| other = 
}}

The Most Reverend Patrick Fani Chakaipa''' (25 June 1932 – 8 April 2003) was the Archbishop of Harare from 1976 until his death in 2003.

Early life
He was born in Chirundazi (Mhondoro) which is some 100 km south of Harare. He was of the Zezuru tribe. His early life must have included the typical life of a Zezuru boy which includes herding cattle goats or sheep as well as working on the fields. He attended secondary school education at St. Michael's Mission Mhondoro, which is a Roman Catholic school. He was well known for his strict discipline during school days and perseverance in difficult situations. He was good at football and was affectionately known by his first name Fani.

Episcopate
He was the first African Roman Catholic bishop in Rhodesia/Zimbabwe. During his seminary years he was a keen writer and completed several books which were written in his Zezuru language.  Some of the books included adventure and African culture folklore (Rudo Ibofu, Garandichauya, Karikoga Gumi Remiseve, Pfumo Reropa, Dzasukwa Mwana Asinahembe). He was very instrumental in keeping the Catholic faith among Mondoroans influencing quite a substantial number of young Zezuru Mhondoroans to join the priesthood. He officiated at the swearing ceremony of Zimbabwe's first black African leader Robert Gabriel Mugabe. He presided at the president's wedding to his second wife Grace Mugabe.

Burial
After his death, he was buried at Chishawasha cemetery near Harare.

External links
Profile at Catholic Hierarchy website

1932 births
2003 deaths
20th-century Roman Catholic archbishops in Zimbabwe
21st-century Roman Catholic archbishops in Zimbabwe
People from Harare
Rhodesian Roman Catholic archbishops
Shona people
Roman Catholic archbishops of Harare
Zimbabwean Roman Catholic archbishops